Jamae Mosque (Jawi:) is one of the earliest mosques in Singapore, and is located on South Bridge Road in the Chinatown district within the Central Area. The mosque was established in 1826. Together with its neighbour, Sri Mariamman Temple, the mosque stands out in its predominantly Chinese location. The Mosque Street that runs beside it may have been named after this mosque.

History

Jamae Mosque was established by the Chulias, who were Tamil Muslims from the Coromandel Coast of South India. They came to Singapore mostly as traders and money changers and set up three mosques within a short time, with Jamae Mosque being the first.  The other two are Al-Abrar Mosque and Nagore Durgha, both of which are on Telok Ayer Street. A mosque was initially set up on South Bridge Road around 1826 under the leadership of Ansar Saib, and the current Jamae Mosque was then constructed on the site between 1830 and 1835.

In 1881, after the early benefactors had died, a lease was granted to five trustees of the mosque, and in 1894, the Jamae Mosque and Nagore Durgha were placed under a new panel of court-appointed trustees. In 1917, the Mohammedan and Hindu Endowments Board took over the management of the mosque until 1968, when it handed the reins over to Majlis Ugama Islam Singapura (MUIS).

Despite two proposals to rebuild it, the present structure has remained more or less unchanged since it was completed in 1835. Repair work was undertaken in 1996. Jamae Mosque is skewed towards Mecca although the mosque's compound is aligned with the street grid.

Jamae Mosque's value as a historical site was recognised when it was gazetted as a national monument on 19 November 1974.

Architecture

Worshippers enter the mosque through a gateway framed by two minarets topped by onion domes and a miniature four-storey palace façade. Rising out of solid bases, each minaret comprises seven levels embellished with a miniature mihrab motif and deep recesses. The palace façade sits on top of the gate, between the minarets. Intricately designed, it features tiny doors and cross-shaped windows.

In the mosque compound are a covered foyer, the main prayer hall, and the ancillary prayer hall. It also contains a shrine to an early local Muslim religious leader, Muhammad Salih Valinvah, whose grave existed on the site before the construction of the mosque in the 1830s. From the foyer, a stairway leads to the parapet from which calls to prayer would have been announced. Beyond the foyer is the ancillary prayer hall, a square airy room with arched openings in its brick walls. Timber fanlights and bars decorate each opening, as do patterned Chinese green glazed tiles. Inside the ancillary hall is the main prayer hall. Also a square airy room, it is supported by two rows of Tuscan columns with elaborate mouldings. Verandahs lie on the north and south sides, separated from the hall proper by timber doors.

The mosque's architectural style is eclectic that reflected the architectural styles of 1830s Singapore. While the entrance gate is distinctively South Indian, the two prayer halls and the shrine are in the Neo-Classical style typical of George Drumgoole Coleman, the first trained architect in Singapore. This uniqueness of Jamae Mosque made it a well-photographed landmark that may be seen in postcards from the 19th century to the present day.

Transportation
The mosque is accessible from Chinatown MRT station.

See also
 Islam in Singapore
 List of mosques in Singapore

References

National Heritage Board (2002), Singapore's 100 Historic Places, Archipelago Press,

External links

Official website of Jamae (Chulia) Mosque
Singapore Mosque Directory: Jamae (Chulia)
Jamae Mosque: Mosque for the 'Tamil milkman' - feature article in The Straits Times
Jamae Mosque - article in National Heritage Board's Roots.sg portal
Jamae Mosque - article in the Visit Singapore portal

Jamae
Tourist attractions in Singapore
National monuments of Singapore
Religious buildings and structures completed in 1830
Chinatown, Singapore
Indian diaspora in Singapore
Outram, Singapore
1830 establishments in the British Empire
Tamil Singaporean
19th-century architecture in Singapore